Leon Warnerke (26 May 1837 – 7 October 1900) was a Polish civil engineer and inventor in the field of photography, independence activist, revolutionary and successful forger. Leon Warnerke was a pseudonym; his real name was Władysław Małachowski.

Early career 

Władysław Małachowski's dates and places of birth and death are unconfirmed. He graduated from the Institute of Communication Engineers in St. Petersburg in 1859, then worked in Vilnius on the construction of the Petersburg-Warsaw Railway. In 1863 he joined the January Uprising and then became a member of the National Government in Vilnius. After the collapse of the uprising, the police, on the orders of general M. Murawjow, issued an arrest warrant for Małachowski with a reward of 10 thousand zlotys, as a result of which he was forced to flee the country. He escaped with his wife on board an English ship to Great Britain, carrying a false passport in the name of Warnerke. Around 1870, he settled with his wife and daughter in London, and under a changed name - Leon Warnerke, began research and design in the field of photography. He lived in both London and St Petersburg, establishing a factory, the "Photographic Laboratory Varnerke and Co.", St. Petersburg, at 31 Voznesensky Ave., which manufactured his photographic materials.

Inventor

Roll film 

Warnerke is credited in 1875 with discovering the tanning effect of pyrogallic acid when used in the development of collodion, and an improvement of "dry" collodion emulsion, which he poured on a paper substrate in the form of a film layer. He covered the smooth tissue paper successively with several layers of pure collodion and a solution of gum arabic, which through the formed a base for a photosensitive collodion or gelatin emulsion thick enough to be easily separated from the paper and permanently transferred to a moistened glass plate. The negative thus obtained could be used to make a positive, just like a glass negative. This photosensitive material was produced by Warnerke's own company in sheets and rolls, from which rolls were cut into 100 photos for a single loading. Though, Warnerke achieved satisfactory results, the high production costs mitigated against greater than moderate commercial success.

In 1875, Warnerke constructed a camera equipped with a special cassette for the film he produced in loads of 100 photos. A monorail bellows camera, it was one of the first cameras in the world that permitted taking such a large number of photos on a single load. Warnerke's construction was 9 years ahead of the 1884 invention of roll film by George W. Eastman and Fr. Hannibal Goodwin. Warnerke's camera had a small window of orange glass in the rear wall through which could be read the  number of the negative's frame and position each precisely as the film was wound through; a device commonly used in later, modern cameras.

In 1881, Warnerke constructed another model of a photographic film camera, this time reduced to 40 negatives. The film used in this model was perforated with small holes at intervals of one shot. Because the sensitive gelatin emulsion had no paper backing, the orange window had to be replaced in this model with a tiny alarm bell triggered by an electrical contact being made through the perforations, which sounded after each frame moved to the appropriate point for taking a photo. The battery was inside the film roll. Warnerke's idea was later used by Eastman's company.

Sensitometry 
Warnerke's achievements include the sensitometer, the first effective means of measuring plate speed, developed in 1880, which in the following year was recognized as a standard by a special commission and became the basis for standardisation in the field of photosensitive materials. A reliable speed rating number for a given emulsion could be calculated against the known sensitivity of a collodion plate. Warnerke's sensitometer was equipped with an energised phosphorescent block of calcium sulphide for his exposing source through a glass plate with 25 square fields of increasing density, so that the light absorption coefficient increased twice every three degrees, similar to the scale of the modern DIN system. Sensitivity in Warnerke degrees was a measure used in England almost until the end of the 19th century, but abandoned by 1920.

From 1889 Warnerke manufactured silver chloride gelatin papers for photographic printing.

Networking 
Apart from his inventive and entrepreneurial activity, Warnerke maintained contacts with other designers and inventors in the field of photography, as well as with photographic organizations and societies in various European countries. It was thanks to Warnerke that the photographic community in London had the opportunity to learn about the latest achievements on the continent, such as the latest achievements of the Lumière brothers in the field of colour photography, or the Gabriel Lippmann interference method.

Forger 
Warnerke was a successful forger of several eastern European currencies, Russian roubles in particular, for which he was charged in Marseilles, though not convicted. His supposed death in 1900 at the age of 63 he may also have faked to avoid arrest.

Legacy 
The preserved collections and valuable instruments of Warnerke, in the possession of the inventor's daughter, were incinerated during World War II in the bombing of London by the Luftwaffe.

Awards 
Malachowski was awarded the Progress Medal of the Photographic Society of Great Britain (known as Royal Photographic Society today) in 1882.

References

External links 

Polish inventors
Polish photographers
English inventors
English photographers
English fraudsters
Polish engineers
English anarchists
English counterfeiters
1873 births
1900 deaths
Polish anarchists